Kalateh-ye Shoqan (also Romanized as Kalāteh-ye Shoqān and Kalateh-e Shoqan; also known as Kalāteh-ye Shoqānīhā) is a village in Shoqan Rural District, Jolgeh Shoqan District, Jajrom County, North Khorasan Province, Iran. At the 2006 census, its population was 278, in 73 families.

References 

Populated places in Jajrom County